The Batley and Spen by-election was a UK parliamentary by-election held on 20 October 2016 in the constituency of Batley and Spen. It was triggered by the murder of the incumbent member of parliament (MP), Jo Cox, on 16 June 2016. The Labour candidate, Tracy Brabin, won with 85.8% of the vote. Four parties with parliamentary representation did not enter candidates, out of respect for Cox. Nine candidates contested against Labour, and none reached the 5% threshold to keep their deposit.

The by-election was scheduled to coincide with the Witney by-election. They were the fifth and sixth by-elections of the 56th UK Parliament.

Candidates
The Conservative Party, the Liberal Democrats, UKIP and the Green Party all declined to contest the election, as a mark of respect. Brendan Cox, Jo Cox's widower, also ruled out standing for the seat.

Labour began selecting a candidate on 14 September. The Batley-born actress Tracy Brabin and the Keighley-based campaigner, Jane Thomas, were shortlisted for selection on 19 September. Brabin won the selection on 23 September. She had campaigned for Cox at the 2015 election, and had been told by her that "you should be an MP".

On 18 July, the English Democrats announced that its deputy chairman, Therese Hirst, a former leader of Veritas, would be its candidate. Hirst (as Therese Muchewicz) stood in Bradford West at the 2015 general election, but came last with 98 votes (0.2%). She was again its candidate for West Yorkshire in the 2016 Police and Crime Commissioner elections, where she again had the least support, with 20,656 votes (3.9%). She had previously stood for Veritas in Bradford South in 2005.

The British National Party (BNP) chose David Furness, who had earlier that year received 0.5% of votes in the London mayoral election. The National Front chose the veteran campaigner Richard Edmonds, a perennial candidate for them and the BNP who came last with 49 votes in Carshalton and Wallington in the 2015 general election. On 18 June 2016, Liberty GB announced that Jack Buckby, a former BNP politician, would be its candidate in the by-election. Liberty GB registered the description "No to terrorism, yes to Britain", which appeared on the ballot paper instead of the party name. Neil Humphrey stood for the English Independence Party as Corbyn Anti (and so was listed as "Anti Corbyn" on the ballot paper); this new party supported English nationalism.

Waqas Ali Khan stood as an independent; he was the UKIP candidate for Shipley at the 2015 general election, coming third of six candidates. Garry Kitchin previously stood for the Green Party in local elections. He was the only candidate registered to an address in the constituency. A London-based musician, Ankit Love, stood for the One Love Party, which campaigns against air pollution. He contested several elections earlier in the year, including the London mayoral election.

Result
The result was declared at 1:45 am at Cathedral House in Huddersfield. Brabin held the seat for Labour on one of the lowest turnouts for a parliamentary by-election since the end of the Second World War. All other candidates polled less than 5% of the vote and lost their deposits. Brabin was heckled by some of the other candidates as she delivered her speech at the declaration of the result. In her speech she said, "Tonight is a bittersweet occasion for me. That this by-election had to take place at all is a tragedy. Whether you voted for me, voted for other candidates or didn't vote at all, I give you my word, I will be equally strong for each and every one of you." She thanked the parties who chose not to contest the election and declared a victory for "unity and hope". Cox's widower, Brendan, was pleased that the far-right candidates lost their deposits.

2015 result

See also
 2021 Batley and Spen by-election, another by-election for the constituency
 2022 Southend West by-election, another by-election which was held under similar circumstances
 List of United Kingdom by-elections (2010–present)

References 

Batley and Spen by-election
Batley and Spen by-election
By-elections to the Parliament of the United Kingdom in West Yorkshire constituencies
Jo Cox
Batley and Spen by-election
2010s in West Yorkshire